Jem Smith (21 January 1863 – 10 September 1931) was a bare-knuckle prize fighter and Heavyweight Champion of England in the late 19th century and into the early 20th century. In 2010 he was inducted into the Bare Knuckle Boxing Hall of Fame.

Early career 

In 1881 he fought his first bare-knuckle prizefight aged 18 years. In 1889, he participated in a fight against Frank Slavin, where he was roundly outclassed by Slavin by all accounts, and knocked out cold for ten minutes, but the circumstances had been so unfairly stacked against his opponent, the referee called it a draw after 14 rounds. It was the last internationally recognized bare-knuckle prizefight, and fought in Bruges, Belgium.

Titles 
Smith fought his first heavyweight title fight in 1884 against Woolf Bendoff in the West End of London, England and won by TKO in the 13th round. He fought Jake Kilrain in 1887, in defence of his heavyweight title. The match lasted 2 and a half hours and after 106 rounds the bout was called a draw due to darkness. In 1891 he fought his last BBBC fight against Ted Pritchard in New Cross, also in London, England and lost by a TKO in the 3rd round.

References 

 BoxRec

External links 
Cyberzone boxing website data and photo
Boxinggyms contemporary newspaper reporting of his fight with John L Sullivan of Boston USA in 1887

See also
List of bare-knuckle boxers

English male boxers
Bare-knuckle boxers
1863 births
1931 deaths